Patrizia Polliotto is an Italian corporate lawyer and entrepreneur. She is president of the UNC Piedmont regional committee.

Background and education 
Polliotto was born in  21st March in 1962 in Pinerolo, Turin, Piedmont, in the Northwestern region of Italy. She graduated in law in 1986 at the University of Turin and later attended the London School of Economics and the school of notaries in Milan and Rome. Since 2007 she has been a lawyer in the Italian Supreme court. 

Polliotto is known for her extensive experience in holding top positions in Italian multinational companies. She has been a liquidator, auditor, president, independent director and member board of directors for companies such as IREN Group, Finmeccanica, Compagnia di San Paolo, Juventus, Zucchi, Viasat among others.

Career 
 In April 2021 she was elected as a member of the board of directors of NB Aurora. 
In 2020 she became a member of the Supervisory Body of the Compagnia di San Paolo
 In 2019 she was appointed chairperson of the Board of Directors of the Istituto Ortopedico Galeazzi spa which owns 3 hospitals (the Galeazzi Orthopedic Institute, the Sant 'Ambrogio and the San Siro) and is part of the San Donato Group.
 In 2016 she became a board director of vincenzo zucchi spa and later in 2019 was elected as member of the supervisory body of the same company.
 She was a member of the management committee of the Compagnia di San Paolo (from 2012 on the designation of the piedmont region, while from 2004 to 2008 and from 2010 to 2012 she was a board member of the same banking foundation on the designation of the Ministry of Equal Opportunity, Municipality of Turin).
 She held the role of CEO of Icarus Spa on the designation of  Finmeccanica Group Real Estate Spa from  2010 to 2014.
 From 2006 to 2012 she was the director of the Fondazione Teatro Nuovo for dance on designation by the municipality of Pinerolo.
 From 2012 to 2013 she held the role of board director at Biancamano Spa.

Books 
In 2012 Polliotto published her first book titled "La sola dei famoso" an Italian word meaning 'The only one of the famous'. It was based the story of the scams suffered by the most famous personalities with the patronage of the national consumers union of Italy. The book was officially launched at the International book fair of Turin.

Additional information 
In August 2021, Forbes named Polliotto among the top four women who have brought prestige to the world of corporate responsibility in Italy.

Polliotto is the owner of an information column on consumerism issues published weekly in the local newspaper Cronache. She as well  writes and publishes articles in the online magazine Ned Community and other online newspapers on the subject of business and finance.

References 

Living people
1962 births
People from Pinerolo
Italian women lawyers
University of Turin alumni
Alumni of the London School of Economics
People from Turin
20th-century Italian lawyers